Acacia anasilla is a shrub belonging to the genus Acacia and the subgenus Lycopodiifoliae that is endemic to north western Australia.

Description
There are 15 to 20 slender straight phyllodes per whorl, the lower ones are erect and the upper ones are spreading to gently recurved. It blooms in July and produces yellow flowers. The spherical heads of the inflorescences contain 40 to 50 densely packed yellow flowers.

Taxonomy
The species was first formally described by the botanist Alexander Segger George in 1999 as part of the work Seven new species in Acacia section Lycopodiifolia (Mimosaceae) as published in the Journal of the Royal Society of Western Australia. It was reclassified as Racosperma anasillum by Leslie Pedley in 2003 and transferred back to the genus Acacia in 2006. The type specimen was collected from Mabel Downs Station near Winnimarra Spring in 1989 by K.A.Menkhorst. It is similar in appearance to Acacia lycopodiifolia and Acacia smeringa.

Distribution
It is native to an area in the Kimberley region of Western Australia where it is found in arid barren quartzite ranges or on granite or sandstone slopes as a part of open Eucalyptus brevifolia woodland communities. Early collections were made around Halls Creek and around the Ord River.

See also
List of Acacia species

References

anasilla
Acacias of Western Australia
Plants described in 1999
Taxa named by Alex George